The Occasional Conformity Act (10 Anne c. 6), also known as the Occasional Conformity Act 1711 or the Toleration Act 1711, was an Act of the Parliament of Great Britain which passed on 20 December 1711. Previous Occasional Conformity bills had been debated in 1702 and 1704, the latter causing the 'Tackers' controversy. It was passed by the Tories to undermine the Whig party, and to ensure that elections to Parliament were under the control of Tories, with non-conformists locked out. It applied to any national or local official in England or Wales who was required to attend Church of England services and take the Lord's Supper. If such a person attended "any conventicle, assembly or meeting" of any other religion, they would be subject to a penalty of £40 and permanently barred from government employment. (The Act did not extend to Scotland, the independence of whose Presbyterian state church (kirk) was guaranteed by the Acts of Union.)

A notable occasional conformist had been the Queen's husband, Prince George, a practising Lutheran; despite this, he had voted for the earlier failed bill in the House of Lords at his wife's request, but died in 1708 before the passage of the act.

Its purpose was to prevent Nonconformists and Roman Catholics from taking "occasional" communion in the Church of England in order to become eligible for public office under the Corporation Act 1661 and the Test Act. Under these acts only members of the Church of England were allowed to hold any office of public trust. The 1711 Act was repealed in 1719. When it was in effect it had little impact. Non-conformist officials were either protected by powerful patrons, or attended private services that were not covered.

Hypocrisy became a major topic in English political history in the early 18th century. The Toleration Act of 1689 allowed for certain rights, but it left Protestant Nonconformists (such as Congregationalists and Baptists) deprived of important rights, including that of office-holding. Nonconformists who wanted office ostentatiously took the Anglican sacrament once a year in order to avoid the restrictions. High Church Anglicans were outraged and outlawed what they called "occasional conformity" in 1711 with the Occasional Conformity Act. In the political controversies using sermons, speeches, and pamphlet wars, both high churchmen and Nonconformists attacked their opponents as insincere and hypocritical, as well as dangerously zealous, in contrast to their own moderation. This campaign of moderation versus zealotry peaked in 1709 during the impeachment trial of high church preacher Henry Sacheverell. By its very ferocity, the debate may have contributed subsequently to more temperate and less charged political discourse. Occasional conformity was restored by the Whigs when they returned to power in 1719.

Notes

Further reading
 Sirota, Brent S. "The Occasional Conformity Controversy, Moderation, and the Anglican Critique of Modernity, 1700–1714". Historical Journal 57.1 (2014): 81–105.

Great Britain Acts of Parliament 1711
History of Christianity in the United Kingdom
History of the Church of England
Christianity and law in the 18th century
Repealed Great Britain Acts of Parliament
Law about religion in the United Kingdom
1711 in Christianity
Prince George of Denmark